The Battle of Odorovtsi was one of the earliest battles of the Serbo-Bulgarian War that took place between the Bulgarian Smilovsky Detachment and the Serbian Cavalry Brigade on November 2, 1885.

The Battle
On November 2, the Serbian  launched an offensive in the Slivnica area. The first troops of the army crossed the border near the village of Odorovtsi. Advanced units consists of a cavalry Serb brigade and 19th Serb Guard battalion which on the evening, reached the Stanyantsi-Izvor line.

The defense of this direction was carried out by the Smilovsky cover-up detachment, which opened the cavalry brigade at about 4 pm and started distant fire. The Serbian troops deployed and began a smooth offensive, and by evening one squadron managed to reach the village of Gulenovtsi, the second - near the village of Smilovtsi, and the third took a position at Petarlashki Heights.

That evening, only the third squadron spent the night in the occupied positions, and the other two withdrew to the border area. They defeated the weak intelligence of the Bulgarian troops as the commander thought that there were significantly more troops against him and withdrew the detachment.

On November 3, the Serbians did not advance due to waiting for the Guards Battalion . Unobstructed by the enemy, the detachment took up a defensive position at Brebevnitsa.

Through its actions, the Smilovo cover-up detachment managed to delay the advance of the Serbian troops by two days and to take good positions in the defense of the road to the village of Izvor.

References

Bibliography
Compound 1885 - encyclopedic reference book. Sofia, State Publishing House "Dr. Peter Beron", 1985 , p. 39

Conflicts in 1885
Battles involving Bulgaria
Battles involving Serbia
1885 in Bulgaria
Serbo-Bulgarian War
History of Pernik Province
November 1885 events